Astrophysics is a peer-reviewed scientific journal of astrophysics published by Springer. Each volume is published every three months. It was founded in 1965 by the Soviet Armenian astrophysicist Viktor Ambartsumian. It is the English version of the journal Astrofizika, published by the Armenian National Academy of Sciences mostly in Russian. The current editor-in-chief is Arthur Nikoghossian.

Aims and scope 

The focus of this journal is astronomy and is a translation of the peer-reviewed Russian language journal Astrofizika.

Abstracting and indexing 

Astrophysics is indexed in the following databases:

Astrophysics Data System
Academic OneFile
Academic Search
Chemical Abstracts Service
CSA
CSA Environmental Sciences
Current Contents/Physical
Chemical and Earth Sciences
Earthquake Engineering Abstracts
EBSCO Discovery Service
Expanded Academic
INIS Atomindex
INSPEC
INSPIRE
Journal Citation Reports/Science Edition
Science Citation Index Expanded
SCImago
SCOPUS
Simbad Astronomical Database
Summon by ProQuest

See also 

 List of astronomy journals

References

External links 

 
astro.asj-oa.am

Astrophysics journals
Publications established in 1965
Springer Science+Business Media academic journals
English-language journals
Quarterly journals